The following is an outline of topics related to the Republic of Trinidad and Tobago.

Trinidad and Tobago
Trinidad and Tobago
Copyright Music Organisation of Trinidad and Tobago
Demographics of Trinidad and Tobago
Environment of Trinidad and Tobago
Flag of Trinidad and Tobago
Foreign relations of Trinidad and Tobago
"Forged From The Love of Liberty"
ISO 3166-2:TT
Minty Alley
National Awards of Trinidad and Tobago
Public holidays in Trinidad and Tobago
Royal Botanic Gardens, Trinidad
The Scout Association of Trinidad and Tobago
Tobago
Trini
Trinidad and Tobago Defence Force
Trinidad and Tobago Regiment
Trinidad
Trinity Cross
Warszewiczia coccinea
Wrightson Road

Buildings and structures in Trinidad and Tobago
 Ato Boldon Stadium
 City Gate (Port of Spain)
 Dwight Yorke Stadium
 Fort San Andres
 Hasely Crawford Stadium
 Larry Gomes Stadium
 Manny Ramjohn Stadium
 Milner Hall
 Port of Spain International Waterfront Centre
 Queen's Park Oval

Airports in Trinidad and Tobago
 Arthur Napoleon Raymond Robinson International Airport (formerly Crown Point Airport)
 List of airports in Trinidad and Tobago
 Piarco International Airport

Government buildings
 The Red House (Trinidad and Tobago)

Hospitals in Trinidad and Tobago
 Port of Spain General Hospital
 San Fernando General Hospital
 Eric Williams Medical Sciences Complex
 Sangre Grande General Hospital
 Mt.hope General Hospital

Museums in Trinidad and Tobago
 African Caribbean Museum of Trinidad and Tobago

Skyscrapers in Trinidad and Tobago
 Eric Williams Plaza
 Nicholas Tower
 Port-Of-Spain International Waterfront
 Government Campus Plaza
 Twin towers of Central Bank

Sports venues in Trinidad and Tobago
 Brian Lara Stadium
 Queen's Park Oval

Football venues in Trinidad and Tobago
 Arima Stadium
 Ato Boldon Stadium
 Dwight Yorke Stadium
 Hasely Crawford Stadium
 Larry Gomes Stadium
 Manny Ramjohn Stadium
 Marvin Lee Stadium
 Palo Seco Velodrome
 Queen's Park Oval
 Sangre Grande Regional Complex

Culture of Trinidad and Tobago

 Burrokeet
 Calinda
 Calypso tent
 Canboulay
 Caribbean Beat
 Trinidad and Tobago Carnival
 Coskel University
 Culture of Trinidad and Tobago
 Divali Nagar
 Doubles (food)
 Extempo
 Extempo Monarch
 Hosay
 J'ouvert
 Limbo (dance)
 Literature of Trinidad and Tobago
 National Library and Information System
 National Museum and Art Gallery, Trinidad
 NGC Bocas Lit Fest
 Peardrax
 Soucouyant
 Trini
 Trinidad and Tobago Carnival
 Trinidad Theatre Workshop

Trinidad and Tobago art

Trinidad and Tobago painters
 Michel-Jean Cazabon
 Boscoe Holder

Music of Trinidad and Tobago

 Music of Trinidad and Tobago
 Cariso
 Cuatro (instrument)
 Chutney music
 Extempo
 Extempo Monarch
 Lancelot Layne
 Parang
 Pichakaree
 Rapso
 Rum and Coca-Cola
 Steelpan
 Daisy Voisin

Trinidadian styles of music

Calypso

 Calypso War
 Calypso jazz
 Calypso music
 Calypsonian
 Caribbean Carnival
 Ice Records
 "Jean and Dinah"
 Justin "Hero" Cassell
 Kaiso
 Lazo (musician)
 List of calypso-like genres
 Denyse Plummer
 Road March
 "Rum and Coca-Cola"
 The Wizzard

Calypsonians
 List of calypso musicians
 Attila the Hun (calypsonian)
 Lord Beginner
 Lionel Belasco
 Mighty Bomber
 Calypso Rose
 Chalkdust
 Crazy (calypsonian)
 Errol Duke
 Louis Farrakhan
 Eric Gibson
 Growling Tiger
 Grynner
 Gypsy (calypsonian)
 Wilmoth Houdini
 Lord Invader
 Lord Kitchener (calypsonian)
 Sir Lancelot (singer)
 Roaring Lion
 Lord Melody
 Mighty Panther
 David Rudder
 Ras Shorty I
 Mighty Sparrow
 Mighty Spoiler
 Black Stalin
 Superblue
 Mighty Terror

Chutney music
 Chutney music
Chutney musicians
 List of chutney musicians
 Babla & Kanchan
 Rikki Jai
 Neeshan Prabhoo
 Drupatee Ramgoonai
 Adesh Samaroo
 Sundar Popo
 Rakesh Yankaran

Soca
 Soca music
 Caribbean Carnival
 Ice Records
 Road March

Soca musicians
 Anslem Douglas
 Bunji Garlin
 Crazy (calypsonian)
 Denise Belfon
 Destra Garcia
 Fay-Ann Lyons
 Kes (band)
 Ken Marlon Charles (KMC)
 Lord Beginner
 Lord Kitchener (calypsonian)
 Machel Montano
 Maximus Dan
 Nadia Batson
 Patrice Roberts
 Ras Shorty I
 Roaring Lion
 Rikki Jai
 Shurwayne Winchester
 Superblue
 David Rudder

Rappers 
 Nicki Minaj
 Trinidad James

Steelpan music
 Steelpan

Steelbands
 List of steelbands
 Phase II Pan Groove

Steelpan musicians
 Lennox Mohammed
 Lennox Sharpe

Economy of Trinidad and Tobago

 Economy of Trinidad and Tobago
 Trinidad and Tobago dollar

Companies of Trinidad and Tobago

 Caribbean Airlines
 CL Financial
 Cable Company of Trinidad and Tobago
 Caribbean Development Company
 Columbus Communications
 Eastern Caribbean Gas Pipeline Company Limited
 House of Angostura
 Kiss Baking Company Limited
 Media and Editorial Projects Limited
 National Gas Company of Trinidad and Tobago
 Petrotrin
 Royal Bank of Trinidad and Tobago
 S.M. Jaleel and Company
 Telecommunications Services of Trinidad and Tobago
 Tobago Express

Mobile phone companies of Trinidad and Tobago
 Digicel
 Bmobile

Education in Trinidad and Tobago
 Pan Pipers Music School

Schools in Trinidad and Tobago
 List of schools in Trinidad and Tobago
 Aranguez Senior Comprehensive
 Arima Government Secondary
 Charapicaima Senior Secondary
 Couva Government Secondary
 Guayaguayare High School
 Hill View College
 Holy Faith Convent Penal
 Naparima College
 North Eastern College
 Palo Seco Government Secondary
 Point Fortin Senior Secondary
 Mayaro Composite School
 Morvant Laventille Secondary
 Toco Composite School
 St Stephen's College
 Pleansantville Secondary
 Immanuel's High School Barataria

Universities and colleges in Trinidad and Tobago
 List of universities in Trinidad and Tobago
 University of the West Indies
 University of Trinidad and Tobago
 University of the Southern Caribbean

Environment of Trinidad and Tobago

Conservation in Trinidad and Tobago
 Asa Wright Nature Centre
 Pointe-à-Pierre Wild Fowl Trust

Wildlife of Trinidad and Tobago
 List of snakes of Trinidad and Tobago
 List of birds of Trinidad and Tobago

Fauna of Trinidad and Tobago
 Anaconda
 Anhinga
 Anilius scytale
 Atractus trilineatus
 Audubon's shearwater
 Spectacled thrush
 Black-crowned night heron
 Boat-billed heron
 Bothrops atrox
 Brown booby
 Brown pelican
 Cane toad
 Cattle egret
 Chironius carinatus
 Chironius multiventris
 Chironius scurrulus
 Collared peccary
 Crab-eating raccoon
 Dipsas variegata
 Erythrolamprus aesculapii
 Erythrolamprus bizona
 Erythrolamprus ocellatus
 Glossy ibis
 Great blue heron
 Great egret
 green anaconda
 Green heron
 Helicops angulatus
 Hydrops triangularis
 Imantodes cenchoa
 Lachesis (genus)
 Lachesis muta
 Leach's storm-petrel
 Least bittern
 Least grebe
 Leatherback sea turtle
 Leptodeira annulata
 Leptophis ahaetulla
 Leptophis stimsoni
 Linnaeus's mouse opossum
 Liophis cobellus
 Liophis reginae
 Little blue heron
 Little tinamou
 Magnificent frigatebird
 Mastigodryas boddaerti
 Neotropic cormorant
 Ninia atrata
 Northern gannet
 Ocelot
 Oilbird
 Oxybelis aeneus
 Oxyrhopus petola
 Paca
 Pied-billed grebe
 Pseudoboa neuwiedii
 Pseustes poecilonotus
 Pseustes sulphureus
 Red-billed tropicbird
 Red-footed booby
 Red-rumped agouti
 Red-tailed boa
 Roseate spoonbill
 Rufous-vented chachalaca
 Scarlet ibis
 Sibon nebulata
 Siphlophis cervinus
 Snowy egret
 Spectral bat
 Spilotes pullatus
 Striated heron
 Tantilla melanocephala
 Tricolored heron
 Tripanurgos compressus
 Typhlops brongersmianus
 Typhlops trinitatus
 Vampire bat
 West Indian manatee
 White-tailed tropicbird
 Yellow-crowned night heron

Flora of Trinidad and Tobago
 Andira inermis
 Kapok
 Mamoncillo

Geography of Trinidad and Tobago
 Geography of Trinidad and Tobago
 Aripo (disambiguation)
 Boca del Serpiente
 Bocas del Dragón
 Caroni Swamp
 Caroni, Trinidad and Tobago
 Cedros, Trinidad and Tobago
 Columbus Channel
 Counties of Trinidad and Tobago
 East-West Corridor
 Grande Riviere
 Gulf of Paria
 L'Anse Mitan
 Maracas Beach
 Maracas–Saint Joseph
 Mayaro
 Nariva
 Nariva Swamp
 Pitch Lake
 Point Lisas
 Saint Andrew, Trinidad and Tobago
 Saint David, Trinidad and Tobago
 Saint George, Trinidad and Tobago
 Saint Patrick, Trinidad and Tobago
 San Fernando Hill
 Trinidad and Tobago dry forests
 Victoria, Trinidad and Tobago

Chaguanas
 Chaguanas
 Cunupia
 Divali Nagar
 Presentation College Chaguanas

Islands of Trinidad and Tobago
 Islands of Trinidad and Tobago
 Chacachacare
 Gaspar Grande
 Huevos
 Little Tobago
 Monos
 Nelson Island, Trinidad and Tobago
 Saint Giles Island
 Tobago
 Trinidad

Lakes of Trinidad and Tobago
 List of reservoirs and dams in Trinidad and Tobago

Mountains of Trinidad and Tobago
 Central Range, Trinidad and Tobago
 El Cerro del Aripo
 El Tucuche
 Northern Range
 Trinity Hills

Port of Spain
 Beetham Estate Gardens
 Ellerslie Park
 Eric Williams Plaza
 Federation Park
 Fort San Andres
 Hasely Crawford Stadium
 Independence Square (Port of Spain)
 International School of Port-of-Spain
 Laventille
 National Museum and Art Gallery, Trinidad
 Nicholas Tower
 Phase II Pan Groove
 Port of Spain
 Queen's Park Oval
 Royal Botanic Gardens, Trinidad
 Sea Lots
 Sixth Form Government Secondary School

Rivers of Trinidad and Tobago
 List of rivers in Trinidad and Tobago
 Caroni River (Trinidad and Tobago)
 Caura River
 Guaracara River

San Fernando
 Manny Ramjohn Stadium
 Marabella
 San Fernando Hill
 San Fernando, Trinidad and Tobago

Towns in Trinidad and Tobago

 List of cities and towns in Trinidad and Tobago
 Arima
 Arouca, Trinidad and Tobago
 Barataria, Trinidad and Tobago
 Blanchisseuse
 Buenos Ayres
 Canaan, Tobago
 Castara
 Cedros, Trinidad and Tobago
 Chaguanas
 Chaguaramas
 Charlotteville
 Claxton Bay
 Couva
 Cumuto
 Cunupia
 Curepe
 Debe
 Diego Martin
 East–West Corridor
 Fyzabad
 Gasparillo
 Guayaguayare
 Hardbargin
 La Brea, Trinidad and Tobago
 Laventille
 Marabella
 Mayaro
 Morvant
 Penal
 Piarco
 Piparo
 Point Fortin
 Point Lisas
 Pointe-à-Pierre
 Princes Town
 Rio Claro, Trinidad and Tobago
 Saint Augustine, Trinidad and Tobago
 Saint Joseph, Trinidad and Tobago
 San Juan, Trinidad and Tobago
 Sangre Grande
 Santa Cruz, Trinidad and Tobago
 Scarborough, Tobago
 Siparia
 Speyside, Trinidad and Tobago
 Tabaquite
 Trincity
 Tunapuna

Trinidad and Tobago geography stubs
 Arima
 Aripo (disambiguation)
 Arouca, Trinidad and Tobago
 Arthur Napoleon Raymond Robinson International Airport
 Asa Wright Nature Centre
 Banwari Trace
 Barataria, Trinidad and Tobago
 Beetham Estate Gardens
 Beetham Highway
 Boca del Serpiente
 Bocas del Dragón
 Buenos Ayres
 Canaan, Tobago
 Caroni River (Trinidad and Tobago)
 Caroni Swamp
 Caroni, Trinidad and Tobago
 Castara
 Caura River
 Cedros, Trinidad and Tobago
 Central Range, Trinidad and Tobago
 Chacachacare
 Chaguaramas
 Charlotteville
 Churchill–Roosevelt Highway
 Columbus Channel
 Couva
 Couva–Tabaquite–Talparo
 Cuisine of Trinidad and Tobago
 Cumuto
 Cunupia
 Curepe
 Debe
 Delaware Bank
 Diego Martin
 Diego Martin region
 East-West Corridor
 Eastern Main Road
 El Cerro del Aripo
 El Tucuche
 Ellerslie Park
 Englishman's Bay
 Federation Park
 Fyzabad
 Galera Point
 Gaspar Grande
 Gasparillo
 Guaracara River
 Guayaguayare
 Gulf of Paria
 Hardbargin
 Huevos
 Icacos Point
 Independence Square (Port of Spain)
 L'Anse Mitan
 La Brea, Trinidad and Tobago
 Laventille
 Marabella
 Maracas Beach
 Maracas–Saint Joseph
 Mayaro
 Monos
 Mount Saint Benedict
 Nariva
 Nelson Island, Trinidad and Tobago
 Penal
 Penal–Debe
 Petit Trou
 Piarco
 Piarco International Airport
 Piparo
 Pitch Lake
 Point Fortin
 Point Lisas
 Pointe-à-Pierre
 Princes Town
 Princes Town Regional Corporation
 Regional Corporations and Municipalities of Trinidad and Tobago
 Rio Claro, Trinidad and Tobago
 Rio Claro–Mayaro
 Royal Botanic Gardens, Trinidad
 Saint Andrew, Trinidad and Tobago
 Saint Augustine, Trinidad and Tobago
 Saint David, Trinidad and Tobago
 Saint George, Trinidad and Tobago
 Saint Giles Island
 Saint Joseph, Trinidad and Tobago
 Saint Patrick, Trinidad and Tobago
 San Juan, Trinidad and Tobago
 San Juan–Laventille
 Sangre Grande
 Sangre Grande Regional Corporation
 Santa Cruz, Trinidad and Tobago
 Scarborough, Tobago
 Sea Lots
 Siparia
 Siparia region
 Sir Solomon Hochoy Highway
 Speyside, Trinidad and Tobago
 Tabaquite
 Template:Trinidad-geo-stub
 Trincity
 Trinity Hills
 Tunapuna
 Tunapuna–Piarco
 Uriah Butler Highway
 Victoria, Trinidad and Tobago

Government of Trinidad and Tobago
 Couva–Tabaquite–Talparo Regional Corporation
 Diego Martin Regional Corporation
 House of Representatives of Trinidad and Tobago
 Legislative Council of Trinidad and Tobago
 Parliament of Trinidad and Tobago
 Penal–Debe Regional Corporation
 President of Trinidad and Tobago
 Princes Town Regional Corporation
 Regional Corporations and Municipalities of Trinidad and Tobago
 Rio Claro–Mayaro Regional Corporation
 San Juan–Laventille Regional Corporation
 Sangre Grande Regional Corporation
 Senate of Trinidad and Tobago
 Siparia Regional Corporation
 Tobago House of Assembly
 Tunapuna–Piarco Regional Corporation

Governors of Trinidad and Tobago
 List of Governors of Trinidad and Tobago
 List of Governors of Trinidad
 List of Governors of Tobago
 Ralph Abercromby
 Frederick Barlee
 Edward Beetham
 Frederick Broome
 John Manners-Sutton, 3rd Viscount Canterbury
 José Maria Chacón
 John Chancellor (British administrator)
 Charles Elliot
 George Harris, 3rd Baron Harris
 Solomon Hochoy
 Alfred Claud Hollis
 Hubert Rance
 Henry Moore Jackson
 Hubert Jerningham
 George Le Hunte
 Cornelius Alfred Moloney
 Sir William Robinson
 Arthur Hamilton-Gordon, 1st Baron Stanmore
 Samuel Herbert Wilson

Governors-General of Trinidad and Tobago
 List of Governors-General of Trinidad and Tobago
 Ellis Clarke
 Solomon Hochoy

Presidents of Trinidad and Tobago
 List of presidents of Trinidad and Tobago
 President of Trinidad and Tobago
 Ellis Clarke
 Noor Hassanali
 George Maxwell Richards
 A. N. R. Robinson
 Anthony Carmona
 Paula-Mae Weekes

Prime Ministers of Trinidad and Tobago
 List of prime ministers of Trinidad and Tobago
 George Chambers
 Patrick Manning
 Basdeo Panday
 A. N. R. Robinson
 Eric Williams
 Kamla Persad-Bissessar

History of Trinidad and Tobago
 History of Trinidad and Tobago
 Arena Massacre
 José Maria Chacón
 Fatel Razack
 Fort San Andres
 Igneri
 Jamaat al Muslimeen coup attempt
 List of Governors of Tobago
 List of Governors of Trinidad
 List of Governors of Trinidad and Tobago
 Literature of Trinidad and Tobago
 National Museum and Art Gallery, Trinidad
 Social unrest in Trinidad and Tobago
 Spanish missions in Trinidad
 Trinidad Government Railway

Elections in Trinidad and Tobago
 Elections in Trinidad and Tobago

Riots and civil unrest in Trinidad and Tobago
 Black Power Revolution
 Canboulay Riots
 Hosay Massacre
 Jamaat al Muslimeen coup attempt
 Social unrest in Trinidad and Tobago

Languages of Trinidad and Tobago
 Tobagonian Creole
 Trinidadian Creole
 Trinidadian English
 Caribbean Hindustani
 Trinidadian French Creole
 Spanish

Trinidad and Tobago media
 Cable Company of Trinidad and Tobago
 Caribbean Communications Network
 Caribbean New Media Group
 Communications in Trinidad and Tobago
 ONE Caribbean Media
 Media and Editorial Projects Limited

Communications in Trinidad and Tobago
 Communications in Trinidad and Tobago
 Trinidad and Tobago Amateur Radio Society
 Area code 868
.tt Internet country code top-level domain for Trinidad and Tobago

Newspapers published in Trinidad and Tobago
 List of newspapers in Trinidad and Tobago
 Trinidad Guardian
 Trinidad and Tobago Express
 Trinidad and Tobago Newsday

Radio stations in Trinidad and Tobago
 Radio in Trinidad and Tobago

Trinidad and Tobago television personalities
 Shelly Dass
 Carla Foderingham
 Francesca Hawkins
 Colleen Holder
 Dominic Kallipersad
 Paolo Kernahan
 Sampson Nanton
 Hazel Ward Redman

Television stations in Trinidad and Tobago
 List of television stations in Trinidad and Tobago
 CCN TV6
 CNMG-TV
 Cable News Channel 3
 Gayelle TV
 IETV
 Islamic Broadcast Network
 Synergy TV
 Template:Trinidad-Tobago-TV
 The Parliament Channel
 Tobago Channel 5
 WIN TV (Trinidad and Tobago)

Trinidad and Tobago people

 Bert Achong
 Rhea-Simone Auguste
 John Stanley Beard
 Floella Benjamin
 Hazel Brown
 Stokely Carmichael
 José Maria Chacón
 Dole Chadee
 Janelle Commissiong
 Hasely Crawford
 Shelly Dass
 Mervyn M. Dymally
 Wendy Fitzwilliam
 Gokool
 Haddaway
 Francesca Hawkins
 Khalid Hassanali
 Noor Hassanali
 Heather Headley
 Geoffrey Holder
 Maurice Hope
 Hubert Julian
 Samuel William Knaggs
 Giselle Laronde
 Rex Lassalle
 Earl Lovelace
 Krishna Maharaj
 Mustapha Matura
 Trevor McDonald
 Michael X
 George Padmore
 Peter Minshall
 Pearl Primus
 Kenneth Ramchand
 Jean Ramjohn-Richards
 George Maxwell Richards
 Marina Salandy-Brown
 Lall Sawh
 Philip Sealy
 Robin Singh
 Austin Stoker
 Lynn Taitt
 Gretta Taylor
 Jeremy Charles Sheldon Taylor
 Valentina Medina
 Austin "Jack" Warner
 Keshorn Walcott

Afro-Trinidadians
 Afro-Trinidadian people
 André Alexis
 Floella Benjamin
 Foxy Brown
 Ellis Clarke
 Janelle Commissiong
 Edric Connor
 Geraldine Connor
 Pearl Connor
 Heather Headley
 Boscoe Holder
 Christian Holder
 Geoffrey Holder
 Karl Hudson-Phillips
 Kelle Jacob
 C. L. R. James
 Anthony Joseph
 Hubert Julian
 K-os
 Roi Kwabena
 Emmanuel Mzumbo Lazare
 Romany Malco
 Michael Anthony (author)
 George Padmore
 Austin Stoker
 Keshorn Walcott
 Henry Sylvester Williams
 Austin "Jack" Warner
 Eric Williams
 Wendy Fitzwilliam

Trinidadian Canadians
 Stephen Ames
 Bas Balkissoon
 Dionne Brand
 Keshia Chanté
 Grégory Charles
 Hedy Fry
 Ian Hanomansing
 Stephen Hart
 Atiba Hutchinson
 K-os
 Harold Sonny Ladoo
 Ishwar Maraj
 Graph Nobel
 M. NourbeSe Philip
 Emile Ramsammy
 Tony Springer
 Rick Titus

Ethnic groups in Trinidad and Tobago

 Cocoa Panyol
 Santa Rosa Carib Community
 Tamil diaspora

Fictional Trinidadians
 Tony Carpenter
 Jules Tavernier
 Patrick Trueman

Indo-Trinidadians
 Indo-Trinidadian
 Tatyana Ali
 Bas Balkissoon
 Neil Bissoondath
 Foxy Brown
 Rudranath Capildeo
 Simbhoonath Capildeo
 Vahni Capildeo
 Dole Chadee
 Winston Dookeran
 Mervyn M. Dymally
 Gokool
 Ian Hanomansing
 Khalid Hassanali
 Noor Hassanali
 Franklin Khan
 Fuad Khan
 Harold Sonny Ladoo
 Gillian Lucky
 Krishna Maharaj
 Ramesh Maharaj
 Satnarayan Maharaj
 Bhadase Maraj
 Ralph Maraj
 Lennox Mohammed
 Shani Mootoo
 Shiva Naipaul
 V. S. Naipaul
 Nadira Naipaul
 Basdeo Panday
 Kamla Persad-Bissessar
 Lakshmi Persaud
 Sundar Popo
 Kenneth Ramchand
 Manny Ramjohn
 Jean Ramjohn-Richards
 Ria Ramnarine
 Adrian Cola Rienzi
 Roger Robinson (poet)
 Lall Sawh
 Samuel Selvon
 Raffique Shah
 Rakesh Yankaran

Trinidad and Tobago people by occupation

Trinidadian academics
 Chalkdust

Trinidad and Tobago actors
 Nina Baden-Semper
 Barbara Eve Harris
 Jeffery Kissoon
 Corinne Skinner-Carter
 Rudolph Walker

Trinidad and Tobago artists
 Sybil Atteck
 Nicole Awai
 Isaiah James Boodhoo
 Cheryl Byron
 LeRoy Clarke
 Vera Cudjoe
 Christopher Guinness
 Boscoe Holder
 Christian Holder
 Amy Leong Pang
 Che Lovelace
 John Lyons (poet)
 Brian Mac Farlane
 Althea McNish
 Wendell McShine
 Peter Minshall
 Wendy Nanan
 Horace Ové
 Zak Ové
 Roberta Silva
 Hugh Stollmeyer

Trinidad and Tobago economists
 Winston Dookeran
 Mary King

Trinidad and Tobago fashion designers
 Anya Ayoung Chee

Trinidad and Tobago lawyers
 Simbhoonath Capildeo
 Karl Hudson-Phillips
 Emmanuel Mzumbo Lazare
 Gillian Lucky
 Ramesh Maharaj
 Basdeo Panday
 Kamla Persad-Bissessar
 Anand Ramlogan
 Adrian Cola Rienzi
 A. N. R. Robinson
 Henry Sylvester Williams

Trinidadian musicians
 Atilla the Hun
 Winifred Atwell
 Lord Beginner
 Lionel Belasco
 Cheryl Byron
 Chalkdust
 Crazy
 Nicki Minaj
 Anslem Douglas
 Errol Duke
 Sharlene Flores
 Destra Garcia
 Growling Tiger
 Gypsy
 Haddaway
 Heather Headley
 Wilmoth Houdini
 Lord Invader
 Anthony Joseph
 Lord Kitchener
 Sir Lancelot (singer)
 Lancelot Layne
 Roaring Lion
 Sam Manning
 Maximus Dan
 Lord Melody
 Lennox Mohammed
 Billy Ocean
 Mighty Panther
 Denyse Plummer
 Sundar Popo
 Neeshan Prabhoo
 Drupatee Ramgoonai
 David Rudder
 Adesh Samaroo
 Lennox Sharpe
 Ras Shorty I
 Mighty Sparrow
 Mighty Spoiler
 Tony Springer
 Black Stalin
 Superblue
 André Tanker
 Gretta Taylor
 Mighty Terror
 Daisy Voisin
 Rakesh Yankaran

Trinidadian jazz musicians
 Hazel Scott
 David "Happy" Williams

Trinidadian drummers
 Pete de Freitas

Trinidad and Tobago photographers
 Horace Ové

Trinidad and Tobago religious leaders
 Yasin Abu Bakr
 Tubal Uriah Butler
 Simbhoonath Capildeo
 Kenneth J. Grant
 Satnarayan Maharaj
 Bhadase Maraj

Trinidad and Tobago scientists
 Rudranath Capildeo
 Robert John Lechmere Guppy
 Howard Nelson
 Lall Sawh

Trinidad and Tobago sportspeople
 Emile Ramsammy

Trinidad and Tobago athletes
 Mike Agostini
 Aaron Armstrong
 Damion Barry
 Ato Boldon
 Darrel Brown
 Marc Burns
 Hasely Crawford
 Jaycey Harper
 Ato Modibo
 Wendell Mottley
 Kevon Pierre
 Julieon Raeburn
 Manny Ramjohn
 Candice Scott
 Keshorn Walcott

Trinidad and Tobago basketball players
 Carl Herrera
 Kareem Abdul-Jabbar

Trinidad and Tobago boxers
 Ria Ramnarine
 Gisselle Salandy
 Leslie Stewart
 Kertson Manswell
 Yolande Pompey
 Claude Noel (boxer)

Trinidad and Tobago cricketers
 Ellis Achong
 Imtiaz Ali
 Inshan Ali
 Nyron Asgarali
 Denis Atkinson
 Nelson Betancourt
 Ian Bishop
 Marlon Black
 Dwayne Bravo
 Lennox Butler
 Joey Carew
 Learie Constantine
 Bryan Davis
 Charlie Davis
 Rajindra Dhanraj
 Mervyn Dillon
 Wilfred Ferguson
 Hammond Furlonge
 Richard S. Gabriel
 Daren Ganga
 Andy Ganteaume
 Larry Gomes
 Gerry Gomez
 Jackie Grant
 Rolph Grant
 Tony Gray
 Mervyn Grell
 Sammy Guillen
 Wes Hall
 David Holford
 Tyrell Johnson
 Prior Jones
 Bernard Julien
 Raphick Jumadeen
 Richard Kelly
 Frank King
 Brian Lara
 Ralph Legall
 Gus Logie
 Norman Marshall
 Cyril Merry
 Dave Mohammed
 Deryck Murray
 Rangy Nanan
 Jack Noreiga
 Lance Pierre
 Kieron Pollard
 Suruj Ragoonath
 Sonny Ramadhin
 Denesh Ramdin
 Ravi Rampaul
 Clifford Roach
 Alphonso Theodore Roberts
 Lincoln Roberts
 Willie Rodriguez
 Leon Romero
 Ben Sealey
 Lendl Simmons
 Phil Simmons
 Charran Singh
 Joe Small (cricketer)
 Sydney Smith
 Wilton St Hill
 Jeff Stollmeyer
 Vic Stollmeyer
 Jaswick Taylor
 Archie Wiles
 David Williams

Trinidad and Tobago footballers
 Ellis Achong
 Lyndon Andrews
 Marvin Andrews
 Joel John Bailey
 Chris Birchall
 David Atiba Charles
 Ian Cox
 Shurland David
 Carlos Edwards
 Ansil Elcock
 Angus Eve
 Leslie Fitzpatrick
 Cornell Glen
 Richard Goddard (footballer)
 Gerry Gomez
 Cyd Gray
 Stephen Hart (footballer)
 Nigel Henry
 Shaka Hislop
 Clayton Ince
 Kelvin Jack
 Avery John
 Stern John
 Kenwyne Jones
 Russell Latapy
 Dennis Lawrence
 Leonson Lewis
 Stokely Mason
 Jerren Nixon
 Jason Norville
 Anton Pierre
 Nigel Pierre
 Brent Rahim
 Marlon Rojas
 Collin Samuel
 Jlloyd Samuel
 Brent Sancho
 Dale Saunders
 Jason Scotland
 Scott Sealy
 Silvio Spann
 Densill Theobald
 Rick Titus
 Tony Warner
 Aurtis Whitley
 Evans Wise
 Anthony Wolfe
 Dwight Yorke

Trinidad and Tobago golfers
 Stephen Ames

Trinidad and Tobago martial artists
 Gary Goodridge
 Marvin Perry

Trinidad and Tobago Olympic competitors
 Mike Agostini
 Aaron Armstrong
 Damion Barry
 Keston Bledman
 Ato Boldon
 Cleopatra Borel-Brown
 Darrel Brown
 Marc Burns
 Hasely Crawford
 Roger Daniel
 Gary Goodridge
 Ato Modibo
 Wendell Mottley
 Julieon Raeburn
 Manny Ramjohn
 Candice Scott
 Richard Thompson
 Keshorn Walcott

Olympic swimmers of Trinidad and Tobago
 George Bovell

Trinidad and Tobago volleyball players
 Gabrielle Reece

Trinidad and Tobago trade unionists
 Tubal Uriah Butler
 Arthur Andrew Cipriani
 C. L. R. James
 Basdeo Panday
 Adrian Cola Rienzi
 Raffique Shah
 Roger Toussaint

Trinidad and Tobago writers
 List of Trinidad and Tobago writers
 André Alexis
 Michael Anthony
 Kevin Baldeosingh
 Neil Bissoondath
 Dionne Brand
 Vahni Capildeo
 Albert Gomes
 C. L. R. James
 Errol John
 Anthony Joseph
 Roi Kwabena
 Earl Lovelace
 Ian McDonald
 Shani Mootoo
 Shiva Naipaul
 V. S. Naipaul
 Lakshmi Persaud
 M. NourbeSe Philip
 Kenneth Ramchand
 Monique Roffey
 Samuel Selvon
 Raffique Shah
 Jeremy Taylor
 Derek Walcott
 A. R. F. Webber
 Eric Williams
 Henry Sylvester Williams

Trinidad and Tobago dramatists and playwrights
 Errol John
 Derek Walcott

Trinidad and Tobago novelists
 Robert Antoni
 Neil Bissoondath
 Ralph de Boissière
 Ramabai Espinet
 Rosa Guy
 Merle Hodge
 C. L. R. James
 Marion Patrick Jones
 Anthony Joseph
 Harold Sonny Ladoo
 Earl Lovelace
 Alfred Mendes
 Shani Mootoo
 Shiva Naipaul
 V. S. Naipaul
 Elizabeth Nunez
 Lakshmi Persaud
 Michel Maxwell Philip
 Raymond Ramcharitar
 Monique Roffey
 Lawrence Scott
 Sam Selvon
 A. R. F. Webber

Trinidad & Tobago people by ethnic or national origin

English Trinidadians
 Chris Birchall

Politics of Trinidad and Tobago

 Politics of Trinidad and Tobago
 Black Power Revolution
 House of Representatives of Trinidad and Tobago
 Jamaat al Muslimeen
 Jamaat al Muslimeen coup attempt
 National Union of Freedom Fighters
 Parliament of Trinidad and Tobago
 Senate of Trinidad and Tobago
 Social unrest in Trinidad and Tobago

Members of the House of Representatives of Trinidad and Tobago
 Vernella Alleyne-Toppin
 Delmon Baker
 Nizam Baksh
 Amery Browne
 Stephen Cadiz
 Donna Cox
 Clifton De Coteau
 Winston Dookeran
 Lincoln Douglas
 Paula Gopee-Scoon
 Tim Gopeesingh
 Rupert Griffith
 Alicia Hospedales
 Nileung Hypolite
 Colm Imbert
 Rudranath Indarsingh
 Fitzgerald Jeffery
 Fuad Khan
 Nela Khan
 Patrick Manning
 Marlene McDonald
 Patricia McIntosh
 Roodal Moonilal
 Colin Partap
 Kamla Persad-Bissessar
 Winston "Gypsy" Peters
 Prakash Ramadhar
 Glenn Ramadharsingh
 Surujrattan Rambachan
 Ramona Ramdial
 Anil Roberts
 Stacy Roopnarine
 Keith Rowley
 Rodger Samuel
 Jairam Seemungal
 Carolyn Seepersad-Bachan
 Chandresh Sharma
 Joanne Thomas
 Herbert Volney
 Austin "Jack" Warner

Former members of the House of Representatives of Trinidad and Tobago
 Rudranath Capildeo
 Simbhoonath Capildeo
 George Chambers
 Carson Charles
 Gypsy (calypsonian)
 Karl Hudson-Phillips
 Ramesh Maharaj
 Bhadase Maraj
 Ralph Maraj
 A. N. R. Robinson
 Raffique Shah
 Eric Williams

Members of the Senate of Trinidad and Tobago
 Ato Boldon
 Knowlson Gift
 Mary King (economist)
 Kenneth Ramchand

Political parties in Trinidad and Tobago
 List of political parties in Trinidad and Tobago
 Butler Party
 Citizens' Alliance
 Committee for Transformation and Progress
 Communist Party of Trinidad and Tobago
 Democratic Action Congress
 Democratic Labour Party (Trinidad and Tobago)
 Democratic National Alliance
 Democratic Party of Trinidad and Tobago
 Movement for National Development
 Movement for National Transformation
 National Alliance for Reconstruction
 National Joint Action Committee
 National Team Unity
 National Transformation Movement
 Organisation for National Reconstruction
 People's Democratic Party (Trinidad and Tobago)
 People's Liberation Movement
 People's National Movement
 Tobago Organization of the People
 United Labour Front
 United National Congress
 Workers and Farmers Party

Trinidad and Tobago politicians
 Attila the Hun (calypsonian)
 Tubal Uriah Butler
 Rudranath Capildeo
 Simbhoonath Capildeo
 George Chambers
 Carson Charles
 Arthur Andrew Cipriani
 Learie Constantine
 Dansam Dhansook
 Winston Dookeran
 Maurice Henry Dorman
 Knowlson Gift
 Albert Gomes
 Geddes Granger
 Gypsy (calypsonian)
 Karl Hudson-Phillips
 A. P. T. James
 C. L. R. James
 Roy Joseph
 Franklin Khan
 Fuad Khan
 Gillian Lucky
 Errol Mc Leod
 Ramesh Maharaj
 Patrick Manning
 Bhadase Maraj
 Ralph Maraj
 Wendell Mottley
 Basdeo Panday
 Kamla Persad-Bissessar
 Adrian Cola Rienzi
 A. N. R. Robinson
 Raffique Shah
 Eric Williams
 Eric A. Williams
 Henry Sylvester Williams
 Gerald Yetming

Public holidays in Trinidad and Tobago
 Emancipation Day
 Indian Arrival Day
 Spiritual Baptist Shouter Liberation Day
 Divali
 Eid-Ul-Fitr
 Republic Day
 Independence Day
 Labour Day
 Corpus Christi
 Christmas Day
 Boxing Day
 New Year's Day
 Good Friday

Religion in Trinidad and Tobago

 Religion in Trinidad and Tobago
 Divali Nagar
 Hinduism in the West Indies
 Islam in Trinidad and Tobago
 Mount Saint Benedict
 Obeah
 Roman Catholicism in Trinidad and Tobago

Religious groups in Trinidad and Tobago
 Anjuman Sunnat-ul-Jamaat Association
 Jamaat al Muslimeen
 Sanatan Dharma Maha Sabha
 Spiritual Baptist
 United Islamic Organisation of Trinidad and Tobago
 South Caribbean Conference of Seventh Day Adventists

Sport in Trinidad and Tobago

 Trinidad and Tobago at the 2006 Commonwealth Games

Cricket in Trinidad and Tobago

 Queen's Park Oval
 Trinidad and Tobago cricket team

Football in Trinidad and Tobago

 Professional Football League (Trinidad and Tobago)
 Soca Warriors Supporters Club
 Trinidad and Tobago Football Federation
 Trinidad and Tobago national football team

Trinidad and Tobago football clubs
 Caledonia AIA
 Defence Force
 Joe Public F.C.
 North East Stars
 San Juan Jabloteh
 South Starworld Strikers
 United Petrotrin
 W Connection

Trinidad and Tobago at the Olympics
 Trinidad and Tobago at the Olympics
 Trinidad and Tobago at the 1948 Summer Olympics
 Trinidad and Tobago at the 1952 Summer Olympics
 Trinidad and Tobago at the 1956 Summer Olympics
 Trinidad and Tobago at the 1964 Summer Olympics
 Trinidad and Tobago at the 1968 Summer Olympics
 Trinidad and Tobago at the 1972 Summer Olympics
 Trinidad and Tobago at the 1976 Summer Olympics
 Trinidad and Tobago at the 1980 Summer Olympics
 Trinidad and Tobago at the 1984 Summer Olympics
 Trinidad and Tobago at the 1988 Summer Olympics
 Trinidad and Tobago at the 1992 Summer Olympics
 Trinidad and Tobago at the 1996 Summer Olympics
 Trinidad and Tobago at the 2000 Summer Olympics
 Trinidad and Tobago at the 2004 Summer Olympics

Sport shooting in Trinidad and Tobago
 Trinidad Rifle Association

Tobago
 Canaan, Tobago
 Castara
 Charlotteville
 Courland colonization of the Americas
 Crown Point Airport
 Democratic Action Congress
 Dwight Yorke Stadium
 Englishman's Bay
 Little Tobago
 Scarborough, Tobago
 Speyside, Trinidad and Tobago
 Tobago
 Tobago Express
 Tobago House of Assembly
 Tobagonian Creole English

Trade unions of Trinidad and Tobago

 All Trinidad Sugar Estates and Factory Workers Union
 All Trinidad Sugar and General Workers' Trade Union
 Federation of Independent Trade Unions and Non-Governmental Organisations
 National Trade Union Centre of Trinidad and Tobago
 National Union of Government and Federated Workers
 National Workers' Union (Trinidad & Tobago)
 Oilfields Workers' Trade Union
 Transport and Industrial Workers Union
 Trinidad and Tobago Unified Teachers Association- TTUTA

Transport in Trinidad and Tobago

 Transport in Trinidad and Tobago
 City Gate (Port of Spain)
 Priority Bus Route
 Trinidad Government Railway
 Trinidad Rapid Railway
 Vehicle registration plates of Trinidad and Tobago

Airlines of Trinidad and Tobago
 Air Caribbean
 BWIA West Indies Airways
 Caribbean Airlines
 Tobago Express

Roads in Trinidad and Tobago
 Beetham Highway
 Churchill-Roosevelt Highway
 Eastern Main Road
 Priority Bus Route
 Sir Solomon Hochoy Highway
 Uriah Butler Highway
 Naparima Mayaro Road

See also

Commonwealth of Nations
List of Caribbean-related topics
List of international rankings
Lists of country-related topics
Outline of geography
Outline of North America
Outline of South America
United Nations

References

External links

 
Outlines of countries